La Verne is a city in Los Angeles County, California, United States.  The population was 31,063 at the 2010 census, down from 31,638 at the 2000 census.

History

The European history of the area dates back to the 1830s when Ygnacio Palomares and Ricardo Véjar received the  Rancho San Jose land grant from Governor Juan Bautista Alvarado in 1837.  The land included the present day cities Pomona, Claremont, San Dimas, Glendora, and La Verne.  The adobe which Palomares built in 1837 is still preserved in Pomona as La Casa Primera de Rancho San Jose (The First House). Palomares soon moved a mile or so northeast and constructed the Ygnacio Palomares Adobe.  He ensured that a nephew, Jose Dolores Palomares, secured a tract of land a mile west.

In the mid-1880s, entrepreneur Isaac W. Lord purchased a tract of Jose Palomares' land and convinced the Santa Fe Railroad company to run its line across towards Los Angeles. Lord had the land surveyed for building lots and in 1887 had a large land sale, naming the new town 'Lordsburg' after himself.  He also had a large Lordsburg Hotel constructed, but the land boom was over by the time it was completed.  It sat empty for several years, until sold to four members of the German Baptist Brethren Church, who persuaded others of that denomination that it would be an excellent site for a new institution of higher learning.  Lordsburg College was founded in 1891.

In 1906 the town was incorporated as "La Verne."  Residents grew field crops, then began planting citrus trees, which flourished.  Lordsburg became known as the "Heart of the Orange Empire." The city of La Verne flourished as a center of the citrus industry until after World War II, when the citrus industry slowly faded away.  Today the last two orange groves are on the grounds of the La Verne Mansion and Heritage Park.

Geography
It is to the east of San Dimas and to the west of Claremont. The city of Pomona lies to the south. California State Route 210 bisects La Verne in an east–west direction, and Historic U.S. Route 66 also passes through the city.

Climate
According to the Köppen Climate Classification system, La Verne has a warm-summer Mediterranean climate, abbreviated "Csb" on climate maps.

Demographics

2010

At the 2010 census La Verne had a population of 31,063. The racial makeup of La Verne was 23,057 (74.2%) White (55.4% Non-Hispanic White), 1,065 (3.4%) African American, 265 (0.9%) Native American, 2,381 (7.7%) Asian, 61 (0.2%) Pacific Islander, 2,822 (9.1%) from other races, and 1,412 (4.5%) from two or more races. Hispanic or Latino of any race were 9,635 persons (31.0%).

The census reported that 30,387 people (97.8% of the population) lived in households, 501 (1.6%) lived in non-institutionalized group quarters, and 175 (0.6%) were institutionalized.

There were 11,261 households, 3,582 (31.8%) had children under the age of 18 living in them, 6,286 (55.8%) were married couples living together, 1,438 (12.8%) had a female householder with no husband present, 489 (4.3%) had a male householder with no wife present.  There were 420 (3.7%) unmarried couples living together, and 74 (0.7%) homosexual partners living together. 2,517 households (22.4%) were one person and 1,429 (12.7%) had someone living alone who was 65 or older. The average household size was 2.70.  There were 8,213 families (72.9% of households); the average family size was 3.16.

The age distribution was 6,605 people (21.3%) under the age of 18, 3,106 people (10.0%) aged 18 to 24, 6,678 people (21.5%) aged 25 to 44, 9,417 people (30.3%) aged 45 to 64, and 5,257 people (16.9%) who were 65 or older.  The median age was 42.9 years. For every 100 females, there were 89.9 males.  For every 100 females age 18 and over, there were 87.2 males.

There were 11,686 housing units at an average density of 1,364.9 per square mile, of the occupied units 8,388 (74.5%) were owner-occupied and 2,873 (25.5%) were rented. The homeowner vacancy rate was 1.7%; the rental vacancy rate was 5.4%.  22,995 people (74.0% of the population) lived in owner-occupied housing units and 7,392 people (23.8%) lived in rental housing units.

During 2009–2013, La Verne had a median household income of $77,040, with 7.9% of the population living below the federal poverty line.

2000

At the 2000 census there were 31,638 people in 11,070 households, including 8,346 families, in the city. The population density was 3,805.8 inhabitants per square mile (1,470.0/km). The racial makeup of the city was 77.06% White, 3.21% African American, 0.64% Native American, 7.20% Asian, 0.17% Pacific Islander, 7.42% from other races, and 4.30% from two or more races. Hispanic or Latino of any race were 23.12%.

Of the 11,070 households 35.5% had children under the age of 18 living with them, 60.0% were married couples living together, 11.5% had a female householder with no husband present, and 24.6% were non-families. 19.6% of households were one person and 9.6% were one person aged 65 or older.  The average household size was 2.79 and the average family size was 3.23.

The age distribution was 25.2% under the age of 18, 9.7% from 18 to 24, 27.4% from 25 to 44, 24.5% from 45 to 64, and 13.1% 65 or older.  The median age was 38 years. For every 100 females, there were 92.7 males.  For every 100 females age 18 and over, there were 89.0 males.

As of 2007, the median household income was $75,444, and the median family income  was $87,915. The per capita income for the city was $31,689.  About 2.5% of families and 4.7% of the population were below the poverty line, including 3.6% of those under age 18 and 4.1% of those age 65 or over.

Government

La Verne is located in the 5th district of Los Angeles County, and is represented by supervisor Kathryn Barger.

The Los Angeles County Department of Health Services operates the Pomona Health Centre in Pomona, serving La Verne.

Public safety
The La Verne Police Department provides law enforcement services for the city of La Verne.

In 2018, the La Verne Police Department appointed its first woman captain, Colleen Flores.

Nick Paz is the current chief of police.

The La Verne Fire Department provides fire protection and emergency medical services for the city of La Verne.

Education

The University of La Verne is located on 3rd Street in La Verne.

The Bonita Unified School District serves the city. Bonita High School is located on D Street.

Lutheran High School is located on Fruit Street. Damien High School is a Catholic boys' school located at the intersection of Damien and Bonita Avenues. Calvary Baptist Schools is located at the intersection of Damien Avenue and Forestdale Street.

Transportation
A future extension of the Metro L Line, from its current terminus in Azusa to the City of Montclair in San Bernardino County, will include a station in La Verne. The station is not expected to be in service until 2026. When it opens, the rail line will be renamed the A Line per Metro's new naming convention, and it will connect with the former Blue Line via the new Regional Connector in downtown Los Angeles.

In popular culture
In the 1967 film The Graduate, the finale wedding scene was shot in La Verne (not Santa Barbara as presented in the movie) at the United Methodist Church of La Verne.

The wedding scene in Wayne's World 2 was also filmed at the United Methodist Church of La Verne.

In 1998, actor Christian Slater was sentenced to 90 days in the La Verne jail for domestic assault

Notable people
 Ewell Blackwell - Major League Baseball pitcher, Bonita High School alumnus
 Noah Clarke - professional hockey player
 Glenn Davis - American football player, Heisman Trophy winner, Bonita High School alumnus, class of 1943
 Ryan Stonehouse - American football player
 Jason David Frank - MMA fighter, Bonita High School alumnus
 Jeffrey Garcia - comedian, voice actor, radio DJ, has a house in La Verne
 Erin Gruwell - author of The Freedom Writers Diary, Bonita High School alumnus
 Sugar Shane Mosley - professional boxer, lives in La Verne
 Paula Jean Myers-Pope - diver, four-time Olympic medalist

References

External links

 
 La Verne Online

 
Cities in Los Angeles County, California
Communities in the San Gabriel Valley
Pomona Valley
Incorporated cities and towns in California
1906 establishments in California
Populated places established in 1906